Zoran Milovac (born 29 October 1988) is a Serbian professional footballer who plays as a midfielder for Sloga Temerin.

Club career
Milovac started out at his hometown club Novi Sad, before transferring to OFK Beograd in the summer of 2006, alongside Stojan Pilipović. He appeared as a substitute in both legs against Auxerre in the 2006–07 UEFA Cup second qualifying round. During his time at Karaburma, Milovac was also sent on loan spells to Mačva Šabac, ČSK Čelarevo, and Inđija.

In the summer of 2010, Milovac returned to Novi Sad, making 48 appearances and scoring 13 goals in the Serbian First League over the next two seasons.

International career
At international level, Milovac was selected to represent Serbia at the 2007 UEFA European Under-19 Championship, but failed to make any appearances in the tournament. He also took part at the 2009 Summer Universiade, hosted by his country.

Honours
Inđija
 Serbian First League: 2009–10

Notes

External links
 
 
 
 

Association football midfielders
Expatriate footballers in Bosnia and Herzegovina
Expatriate footballers in Montenegro
Expatriate footballers in Switzerland
FK BSK Borča players
FK ČSK Čelarevo players
FK Inđija players
FK Mačva Šabac players
FK Modriča players
RFK Novi Sad 1921 players
FK Sloga Temerin players
FK Sutjeska Nikšić players
FK Voždovac players
Montenegrin First League players
OFK Bačka players
OFK Beograd players
Serbia and Montenegro footballers
Serbia youth international footballers
Serbian expatriate footballers
Serbian expatriate sportspeople in Bosnia and Herzegovina
Serbian expatriate sportspeople in Montenegro
Serbian expatriate sportspeople in Switzerland
Serbian First League players
Serbian footballers
Serbian SuperLiga players
Footballers from Novi Sad
1988 births
Living people